Bow Street F.C. are based at Rhydypennau near Bow Street in Ceredigion, Wales, about  north-east of Aberystwyth, and are currently playing in the Ardal Leagues North East. The team are nicknamed the Magpies, from the time when their strip was black and white stripes.

Honours

Aberystwyth Football League Division One
1992–93, 1994–95, 1995–96, 2001–02, 2002–03, 2003–04, 2006–07
League Cup
1985–86, 1988–89, 1991–92, 1992–93, 1994–95
J.Emrys Morgan Cup
1982–83, 1999–00, 2005–06
Mid Wales League Cup – Winners: 2017–18

Current squad
Oliver Farebrother

Jac Williams

Lee Crumpler

Kaine Shephard

Tomos Wyn Roberts

Llyr Hughes

John James

Osian Rees-Jones

Dylan Benjamin

Garmon Nutting

Callum Ferreira

Ryan Evans

Ben Jones

Llion Jenkins

Joe Williams

Llyr Davies

Steffan Richards

Joshua Crowl

Committee

 Secretary:  Peter James
 Treasurer:  Stephen Harrison

External links
Official Website

Football clubs in Wales
Mid Wales Football League clubs
Sport in Ceredigion
Ardal Leagues clubs
Aberystwyth League clubs